SAMC (South American Music Conference) is an electronic dance music festival held annually in Buenos Aires since 2004, carried out in the estate of Costa Salguero Center. It is one of the most important music festivals of South America, with the performances of globally recognized artists.

2004 (December 11)

ROOM 1 (ONE). HOUSE.

16:00 Martin Huergo / 16:30 Luis Calleri / 17:15 Vich & Berger / 17:45 Elio Riso / 18:45 Danny Rampling / 19:45 Bad Boy Bill / 21:30 DJ Dan / 23:00 Smoking Jo / 00:30 Pete Tong / 02:30 John Acquaviva / 04:00 Green Velvet.

ROOM 2 & 3. PROGRESSIVE / TRANCE.

16:00 Jose Luis Gabin / 16:30 Mauro Lucciarini / 17:15 Aldo Haydar / 17:45 Berhuoz / 19:45 Lucien Foort / 20:45 The Union / 21:30 Way Out West / 22:30 Javier Bussola / 23:15 Tall Paul / 00:45 Nick Warren / 02:30 Judge Jules / 04:00 Ferry Corsten.

ROOM 4. TECH HOUSE.

16:00 Maysa-Carpio / 16:30 Tony Mass / 17:00 Tommy Jacobs / 17:30 Mar T / 18:00 Dr. Trincado / 18:45 Evil Eddie Richards / 20:30 Justin Robertson / 22:30 Diego Rok / 23:30 Tiga / 01:30 Derrick May-Francois K / 04:30 Circulation.

ROOM 5. TECHNO.

16:00 Diego Mistick / 16:30 Ingrid / 17:45 Murphy / 18:30 Fabricio Pecaña / 19:30 Anderson Noise / 20:30 DJ Dero / 21:15 Misstress Barbara / 22:45 Marco Bailey / 00:15 Magda / 01:30 Richie Hawtin / 03:00 Christian Smith / 04:30 Chris Liebin.

2005 (October 15)

ROOM 1

17:00 Alejandro Montero / 17:30 Jose Luis Gabin / 18:00 Uma H / 18:45 Carlos Diaz / 19:30 Aldo Haydar / 20:15 Benny Benassi / 21:00 Javier Bussola / 22:00 Christopher Lawrence / 00:00 Tiësto / 02:00 Judge Jules / 04:00 Ferry Corsten.

ROOM 2

17:00 Richy Ryan / 17:30 Tommy Jacobs / 18:15 Mart / 19:00 Alexa / 19:45 Tom Stephan / 21:00 Diego Ro-K / 22:000 Misstress Barbara / 23:00 DJ Dero / 00:00 Marco Bailey / 02:00 Richie Hawtin / 03:00 Adam Beyer.

ROOM 3

17:00 Q.R.L.Y. / 17:45 Marcelo Mato / 18:30 Udolph / 19:15 Respected Two / 20:05 Tom Ricktson / 20:45 Frank Johnson / 21:30 Oscar Bohoruez / 22:15 Lalann / 23:00 Andy Dabula / 23:45 Dj William / 00:30 Chino Benitez / 01:15 Corrie / 02:00 Boeing / 02:45 Eli Iwasa / 03:00 F. Cinelli & N. Purman / 04:30 Fernando Picon / 05:15 Javier Beltran.

2006 (December 9 and 10)

2007 (March 9 and 10)

2008 (March 8)
TO RELEASE
Confirmed, Ferry Corsten, Christopher Lawrence, Matthew Dear, Justin Robertson, Adam Beyer, John O'Callaghan, Marco Carola, Guy Gerber, Anthony Pappa, Mario Fischetti, May Zander, and more national artist.

2009 (September 19)
G.E.B.A

Confirmed: Alex Under, Christian Smith, Joseph Capriati, Alex M.O.R.P.H., Lee Burridge, John 00 Fleming, John Askew, Sean Tyas, Jon O'Bir, Sophie Sugar, Slacker, Kaskade, Elvis T, Mary Zander, Pilas,

Tadeo vs Jonas Kopp, Mariano Trocca, Javier Bussola, Diego Ro-K, Bodeler a.k.a. Baudelaire, Marcelo Fratini, Jorge Savoretti, Lucas Mari, Aldo Haydar, Juan Pablo Sgalia, Franco Cinelli, Andres Zacco, Nico Purman, Heatbeat, Exit, Seven Eleven, Alexis Cabrera, Udolph, Ronan Portela, Andrés Gonzalez, Gabuci, Henan Serrao

South American Music Conference 2005 World Tour

Venezuela (October 13): Timo Mass.
Panama (October 19): Erick Morillo.
Costa Rica (October 21): Boy George + Sandra Collins.
Ecuador (October 28): Mistress Barbara + John Acquaviva + Dave Seaman + Darren Emerson.
Peru (October 31): Seb Fontaine.
Chile (December 1).
Brazil (December 2).

2013
Próximamente ↵ SAMC FESTIVAL - Sábado 05 de octubre 2013 -  Hipodromo de Palermo - Ciudad de Buenos Aires - ARGENTINA

Buenos Aires is again Electronica - SAMC (South American Music Conference) is an electronic music festival held annually in Buenos Aires.
It is one of the most important music festivals in South America, with performances by world-renowned artists.

Line Up confirmado   : ↵  PAUL OAKENFOLD- DANNY TENAGLIA- FERRY CORSTEN- DARREN EMERSON - 
BT - 
CHICANE LIVE -
MARCO V -
RIVA STARR -
SANDRA COLLINS -
PAUL JACKSON -
JOHN CREAMER -
STACEY PULLEN- 
KENNY LARKIN -
KEVIN SAUNDERSON -
IGOR PROJECT (MINISTRY OF SOUND)-
RICK MAIA (MINISTRY OF SOUND)

See also
List of electronic music festivals

References

Music festivals established in 2006
Festivals in Buenos Aires
Recurring events established in 2004
Electronic music festivals in Argentina